"Tears from a Willow" is a song by Ooberman, released as the third single from their debut album The Magic Treehouse. It was released by Independiente in October 1999. In the song's radio edit, a reference to LSD was removed, but remained intact on the single itself. The radio edit has never been released commercially, but can be heard in the song's video. It charted at #62 on the UK Singles Chart.

B-side "Moth to a Flame" was recently voted the best Ooberman song ever by users of the band's online forum.

Track listing

CD (ISOM37MS)
 "Tears from a Willow" (Popplewell)
 "Moth to a Flame" (Flett)
 "Danny Boy" (Popplewell)

7" Vinyl (ISOM37S)
 "Tears from a Willow" (Popplewell)
 "Igloo II: Yellow Snow" (Popplewell)

References

1999 singles
Ooberman songs
1999 songs
Song recordings produced by Stephen Street
Independiente (record label) singles